"Good Stuff" is the title track from American new wave band the B-52's' sixth studio album album of the same name (1992). The instrumental non-album track "Return to Dreamland" is the B-side on some editions, while remixes are featured on other versions. The song reached number 28 on the US Billboard Hot 100 and number one on the Billboard Modern Rock Tracks chart. It also peaked at number two in Portugal, number 21 in the United Kingdom, number 23 in New Zealand, and number 24 in Canada. The music video for "Good Stuff" includes a cameo appearance by RuPaul, who previously appeared in the video for "Love Shack".

Official versions
 "Good Stuff" (album edit) – 4:05	
 "Good Stuff" (12-inch remix) – 7:51 	
 "Good Stuff" (Schottische mix) – 3:40 	
 "Good Stuff" (remix edit) – 3:54
 "Good Stuff" (album version) – 5:58

Charts

See also
 Number one modern rock hits of 1992

References

1992 singles
1992 songs
The B-52's songs
Music videos directed by Marcus Nispel
Reprise Records singles
Song recordings produced by Don Was
Songs written by Fred Schneider
Songs written by Kate Pierson
Songs written by Keith Strickland